Absidia is a genus of zygote fungi in the family Cunninghamellaceae. Absidia species are ubiquitous in most environments where they are often associated with warm decaying plant matter, such as compost heaps. Some species in the genus can cause phycomycosis.

Taxonomy
The genus was first described in 1878 by Philippe Édouard Léon Van Tieghem.

Species
The genus includes the following species:

 Absidia aegyptiaca
 Absidia anomala
 Absidia atrospora
 Absidia caerulea
 Absidia californica
 Absidia clavata
 Absidia cuneospora
 Absidia cylindrospora
 Absidia dubia
 Absidia fassatiae
 Absidia glauca
 Absidia griseola
 Absidia heterospora
 Absidia idahoensis
 Absidia inflata
 Absidia macrospora
 Absidia narayanai
 Absidia pseudocylindrospora
 Absidia psychrophilia
 Absidia reflexa
 Absidia repens
 Absidia spinosa
 Absidia tuneta
 Absidia ushtrina

Synonyms
Absidia corymbifera is a synonym for Lichtheimia corymbifera.

References

External links

 Genus Absidia account
 Doctor Fungus fact sheet
 Mycology Online: A. corymbifera

Zygomycota genera
Cunninghamellaceae
Taxa named by Philippe Édouard Léon Van Tieghem
Taxa described in 1878